Dmitri Anatolyevich Bolshakov (born 10 April 1980) is a former Russian professional footballer.

Club career
He played 4 seasons in the Kazakhstan Premier League

External links
 

1980 births
People from Kamyshin
Living people
Russian footballers
Association football midfielders
FC Tekstilshchik Kamyshin players
FC Irtysh Pavlodar players
FC Taganrog players
Kazakhstan Premier League players
Russian expatriate footballers
Expatriate footballers in Kazakhstan
Russian expatriate sportspeople in Kazakhstan
FC Bolat players
FC Atyrau players
Sportspeople from Volgograd Oblast